Future Breeds is Hot Hot Heat's fourth studio album, released on June 8, 2010 under Dine Alone Records. It is the first album with new bassist Parker Bossley, from Fake Shark – Real Zombie!

Background
On November 11, 2009 Vancouver photoblog, theFuturists released two music videos from the new album compiled of live and candid footage of the band from last 7 months of 2009.

The album was leaked to the internet on May 29.

Three tracks from the album, "JFK's LSD", "Future Breeds", and "Goddess on the Prairie" were posted on Spin Magazine's website. In addition, "Goddess on the Prairie" was one of the songs available in a music pack optionally bundled with Winamp 5.58.

The Album artwork was illustrated by Canadian artist Keith Jones.

Track listing

Notes

External links
 Hot Hot Heat official site

Hot Hot Heat albums
2010 albums